Witches' butter (or Witch's butter) may refer to:

 Exidia nigricans, a black, gelatinous fungus
 Exidia glandulosa, a black, gelatinous fungus
 Tremella mesenterica, a yellow, gelatinous fungus
 Dacrymyces, a jelly fungus often confused with Tremella
 Nostoc, a genus of gelatinous cyanobacteria